HMS Comus was a  destroyer of the Royal Navy, built by Yarrow at Scotstoun, Glasgow. She was launched on 24 August 1943 and commissioned on 20 December 1946.

Operational service
Comus served in the Far East between 1947 and 1957 as part of the 8th Destroyer Squadron.

On Tuesday, 22 August 1950, engaged in the Korean War, she was damaged in the Yellow Sea by two North Korean Ilyushin Il-10.

In 1955 she was engaged in the bombardment of Communist forces as part of the Malayan Emergency.

Decommissioning and disposal
Comus was withdrawn from active service and listed for disposal in 1955. Following her sale Comus arrived at the breakers yard of John Cashmore Ltd for scrapping at Newport, Wales on 12 November 1958.

References

Publications
 
 
 
 

 

Korean War destroyers of the United Kingdom
1945 ships
Ships built on the River Clyde
C-class destroyers (1943) of the Royal Navy
Ships built by John I. Thornycroft & Company